"Bobbie Sue" is a song written by Wood Newton, Dan Tyler and Adele Tyler, and recorded by American country music group The Oak Ridge Boys.  It was released in January 1982 as the first single and title track to the group's album of the same name.  That April, the song became the Oaks' sixth No. 1 single on the Billboard magazine Hot Country Singles chart.

In addition to its country success, "Bobbie Sue" also fared well on the Billboard Hot 100, peaking at No. 12 on that chart in the spring of 1982.

Background
The song is styled much in the vein of a late 1950s/early 1960s rock-and-roll song, as evidenced by its saxophone solo during the musical bridges.

Content
"Bobbie Sue," named for the song's main character (and described as "the sweetest grape that ever grew on the vine"), is in a sense about an 18-year-old woman's sexual awakening. The role of boyfriend, the song's protagonist, is filled by the singer.

The first verse establishes that the protagonist had heard about Bobbie Sue from a friend, and he quickly spends as much time with her as possible. After turning 18, Bobbie Sue begins to rebel against her parents — Robert and Ruth — and decides to marry her boyfriend. Bobbie Sue's parents apparently disapprove of the relationship ("Her Daddy told her that she'd have to wait/Her Mama said don't make a big mistake"), but the young couple is determined to elope ("But we'll keep driving till we're out of state/And when they find us it'll be too late").

Charts

Weekly charts

Year-end charts

References

Works cited
Roland, Tom, "The Billboard Book of Number One Country Hits." (Billboard Books, Watson-Guptill Publications, New York, 1991).

1982 singles
The Oak Ridge Boys songs
Songs written by Wood Newton
Song recordings produced by Ron Chancey
MCA Records singles
1982 songs
Songs written by Dan Tyler